Eutin Castle in Eutin in the north German district of Ostholstein is the cultural centre and nucleus of the town. Taken together, this castle, Gottorf Castle and Glücksburg Castle, form the most important group of courtly secular buildings in the state of Schleswig-Holstein.

History 
The four-winged palace originated from a medieval castle and was expanded over several centuries into a Residenz. The castle originally belonged to the Lübeck prince-bishops; later it became the summer residence of the Dukes of Oldenburg. The castle was regularly occupied until the 20th century, and most of the interior has survived to the present day. Today the castle houses a museum and is open to the public in summer. It is now owned by a family foundation of the House of Oldenburg set up by Anton-Günther, Duke of Oldenburg. The former Baroque garden was converted during the 18th and 19th century to a landscaped park: this is the venue for the Eutin festivals.

Hunting lodge 
A small, late Baroque hunting lodge on the Ukleisee belongs to Eutin Castle. The lodge was built in 1776 at some distance from the main castle at the behest of Frederick Augustus I of Saxony in order to provide a single-storey pavilion for hunting parties and guests attending special occasions.

See also 
 Pheasant Island (Eutin) - a landmark for one of the visual axes of the castle's baroque garden
 Utin Castle

References

Literature 
Heiko Schulze: Schloss Eutin. Verlag Struve, 1991, 
I. Bubert: Gutshöfe, Herrenhäuser und Schlösser im östlichen Holstein. Sventana-Verlag, 1995, 
Hans und Doris Maresch: Schleswig-Holsteins Schlösser, Herrenhäuser und Palais. Husum Verlag, Husum 2006, 
Dehio: Handbuch der Deutschen Kunstdenkmäler Hamburg, Schleswig-Holstein. Deutscher Kunstverlag, München 1994,

External links 
Eutin Castle at museen-sh.de
Photo series of the interior of the castle
Development of the castle park at Eutin
The castle park at Gartenrouten Schleswig-Holstein.de
The Association of Castles and Museums around the Baltic Sea

References 

Castles in Schleswig-Holstein
Museums in Schleswig-Holstein
Gardens in Schleswig-Holstein
Historic house museums in Germany
Water castles in Germany
Buildings and structures in Ostholstein
Eutin